Jim Davidson (born 1953) is an English comedian.

Jim Davidson may also refer to:

 Jim Davidson (actor) (born 1963), American actor
 Jim Davidson (American football), American football player in 1964 Ohio State Buckeyes football team
 Jim Davidson (author), Australian author and former editor of Meanjin
 Jim Davidson (rugby union, born 1931) (born 1931), former Scotland rugby union international
 Jim Davidson (rugby union, born 1942) (1942–2007), Ireland rugby union player and manager
 James Hutchinson Davidson (1902-1982), Australian bandleader commonly known as Jim Davidson

See also
 James Davidson (disambiguation)
 Jimmy Davidson (disambiguation)